Just Jim is a 2015 Welsh black comedy film written and directed by Craig Roberts in his directorial debut. The film stars Roberts as a lonely Welsh teenager who is given the chance to increase his popularity when a cool American (Emile Hirsch) moves in next door

Cast
 Craig Roberts as Jim
 Emile Hirsch as Dean
 Ryan Owen as Michael
 Charlotte Randall as Jackie
 Nia Roberts as Mum
 Aneirin Hughes as Dad
 Mark Lewis Jones as Donald
 Sai Bennett as Michelle
 Trystan Gravelle as John
 Richard Harrington as Headmaster
 Helen Griffin as Beatrice
 Darragh Mortell as The Bed Boy

Release
The film premiered at South by Southwest on 14 March 2015 and was released in the United Kingdom on 25 September 2015.

Reception
The film has received generally positive reviews from critics, holding  approval rating on Rotten Tomatoes based on  reviews. John DeFore of The Hollywood Reporter states in his review: "A misshapen but nicely dressed coming-of-age film." Fionnuala Halligan of ScreenDaily says "As a directorial debut, though, Just Jim is an encouraging start for Roberts, should he ever wish to give up the day job."

References

External links
 
 

2015 films
English-language Welsh films
2015 black comedy films
British black comedy films
British coming-of-age comedy films
2015 directorial debut films
Films set in Wales
Films shot in Wales
2010s coming-of-age comedy films
Films directed by Craig Roberts
2010s English-language films
2010s British films